Caucasus Krai was an administrative division (a krai) of the Russian Empire. It was established in 1844. From that time until 1882 the head of the region (krai) was Viceroy-namestnik, during 1882–1905 glavnoupravlyayushchiy or glavnonachalstvuyushchy ( or главноначальствующий), and in 1905–1917 again namestnik.

References
 Национальные окраины Российской империи: становление и развитие системы управления. М., 1998.
 Кавказский край. Кутаисское генерал-губернаторство. Военно-статистическое обозрение Российской империи, т. 16, ч. 5, Генеральный штаб, 1858 г.

Krais of the Russian Empire
States and territories established in 1844
1844 establishments in the Russian Empire